Chemokine receptor CXCR3 is a Gαi  protein-coupled receptor in the CXC chemokine receptor family.  Other names for CXCR3 are G protein-coupled receptor 9 (GPR9) and CD183. There are three isoforms of CXCR3 in humans: CXCR3-A, CXCR3-B and chemokine receptor 3-alternative (CXCR3-alt). CXCR3-A binds to the CXC chemokines CXCL9 (MIG), CXCL10 (IP-10), and CXCL11 (I-TAC) whereas CXCR3-B can also bind to CXCL4 in addition to CXCL9, CXCL10, and CXCL11.

Expression 

CXCR3 is expressed primarily on activated T lymphocytes and NK cells, and some epithelial cells. CXCR3 and CCR5 are preferentially expressed on Th1 cells, whereas Th2 cells favor the expression of CCR3 and CCR4.  CXCR3 ligands that attract Th1 cells can concomitantly block the migration of Th2 cells in response to CCR3 ligands, thus enhancing the polarization of effector T cell recruitment.

Signal transduction 

Binding of CXCL9, CXCL10, and CXCL11 to CXCR3 is able to elicit increases in intracellular Ca2++  levels and activate phosphoinositide 3-kinase and mitogen-activated protein kinase (MAPK). Detailed signaling pathway has not yet been established, but may include the same enzymes that were identified in the signaling cascade induced by other chemokine receptors.

Function 

CXCR3 is able to regulate leukocyte trafficking. Binding of chemokines to CXCR3 induces various cellular responses, most notably integrin activation, cytoskeletal changes and chemotactic migration. CXCR3-ligand interaction attracts Th1 cells and promotes Th1 cell maturation.

As a consequence of chemokine-induced cellular desensitization (phosphorylation-dependent receptor internalization), cellular responses are typically rapid and short in duration. Cellular responsiveness is restored after dephosphorylation of intracellular receptors and subsequent recycling to the cell surface. A hallmark of CXCR3 is its prominent expression in in vitro cultured effector/memory T cells, and in T cells present in many types of inflamed tissues. In addition, CXCL9, CXCL10 and CXCL11 are commonly produced by local cells in inflammatory lesion, suggesting that CXCR3 and its chemokines participate in the recruitment of inflammatory cells. Additionally, CXCR3 has been implicated in wound healing.

Clinical significance 

CXCR3 has been implicated in the following diseases atherosclerosis, multiple sclerosis, pulmonary fibrosis, type 1 diabetes, autoimmune myasthenia gravis, nephrotoxic nephritis, acute cardiac allograft rejection, allergic contact dermatitis, and possibly Celiac Disease. It may also have implications in lung tissue repair after exposure to cigarette smoking. Development of agents to block CXCR3-ligand interactions may provide new ways to treat these diseases. In addition, CXCR3 has been implicated in inflammatory brain damage in central nervous system (CNS) infections

Cardiovascular implications 

Evidence from pre-clinical and clinical investigations has revealed the involvement of CXCR3 and its ligands in several cardiovascular diseases (CVDs) of diverse etiologies including atherosclerosis, hypertension, Kawasaki disease, myocarditis, dilated cardiomyopathies, Chagas, cardiac hypertrophy and heart failure, as well as in heart transplant rejection and transplant coronary artery disease (CAD).
CXCL9-10-11 have been recognized to be valid biomarkers for the development of heart failure and left ventricular dysfunction in two pilot studies, suggesting an underlining correlation between levels of the interferon (IFN)-γ-inducible chemokines and the development of adverse cardiac remodeling.

Pharmacology 

Recent reports indicate that there is a significant interest for the identification of small-molecule antagonists of CXCR3.  Several small molecules  were found to constitute a promising series of functional antagonists of CXCR3 that could be developed into new therapeutic agents for the treatment of inflammatory disorders such as rheumatoid arthritis, inflammatory bowel disease, multiple sclerosis and diabetes. More recently the first QSAR study concerning antagonists of CXCR3 has been published in the literature. The in silico model provides a time- and cost-effective tool for the screening of existing and virtual libraries of small molecules as well as for designing of novel molecules of desired activity.

See also 

 Chemokine receptors
 Chemokine
 Cluster of differentiation

References

External links 
 
 
 

Clusters of differentiation